Timor (/ˈtaɪˈmɔː/), also known as Timor-Bowenvale, is a mainly rural area in the Central Goldfields Shire of Victoria, Australia.

According to the 2016 Australian census, the populations of the statistical areas making up the Timor area were 181 in Bowenvale, 58 in Timor, and 24 in Timor West. Comparisons with previous censuses must be made carefully due to radical changes in statistical area boundaries.

History

Names 
Places names used in the area over time have included Chinaman's Flat, Butcher's Bridge, Cox Town or Coxtown, Central Chinamans, Leviathan Reef, Timor Creek, Lower Alma, Timor West or Lime Kiln Plains, Dwyer's Bridge, Bowenvale, and Timor.

The term "Bet Bet" must be identified by its context, as its use in earlier times was not only for the Bet Bet Creek. Just as the now-Castlemaine area on the Loddon River was referred to as "of the Loddon" and "Loddon," locations near the Bet Bet Creek were referred to as "of the Bet Bet" and shortened, confusingly, to "Bet Bet". This is not to be confused with the current Bet Bet hamlet, further downstream on Route C278, which in earlier times was known as Grant's Bridge. Much historic documentation, especially maps, includes the word lead. A lead (/ˈliːd/) is an underground seam of gold deposits, and has nothing to do with the metal lead. (/ˈlɛd/)

The historical records for the area are confounded not just by changing place-names, but by formal boundaries being at the confusing crossroads of divisions between various government administrative sections, including between the Counties of Talbot and Gladstone, between the civil Parishes of Bet Bet and Maryborough, between the former local government Shires of Bet Bet and of Tullaroop, which surrounded the Borough, later City, of Maryborough, and between modern administrative regions. Most authorities used the Bet Bet Creek as a boundary, but the Town of Timor straddles it. The shared boundary between the civil Parishes of Maryborough and Bet Bet is partly Bet Bet Creek Road.

Early history 
The area was a small part of the territory of the Djadjawurrung people. The first non-indigenous arrivals came from Britain in the late 1830s and 40s and created two huge sheep runs known as Charlotte Plains and Norwood. The Timor-Bowenvale area straddles a section of their shared boundary. The comments made about the region's indigenous people by early Norwood resident Alfred Joyce in his reminiscences give some insight into tensions of early settlement.

Gold Rush Era 
The first gold discoveries occurred in 1854 or 1855. By June 1855, newspapers regarded "Chinaman's Flat" as a well-known site for prospectors and used "the head of Chinaman's Flat" to describe an area to the west of the current Maryborough-Bowenvale-Timor Road about 5 km from modern Maryborough. This name came from the groups of Chinese immigrants largely from Guangdong Province in southern China who made up a large proportion of the early gold seekers.

Butcher's Bridge and Cox Town 
The track into the Maryborough area became well-established during the next twelve months. Towards the end of 1856, a shorter route between Maryborough and Dunolly was enabled by a young entrepreneur named Cox Butcher who built a basic bridge and an accompanying inn, called The Bridge, at the nearby Bet Bet Creek crossing, close to where a small number of water carriers and gold seekers were living. That location became known as Butcher's Bridge and then Cox Town, gradually shifting towards the latter.

In October 1856, a major rush to a particular point on the Chinaman's Flat Lead began, resulting in the discovery of a gold-bearing quartz reef later named the Leviathan. Urban areas grew along both sides of the Lead. On the west side, there was a Primitive Methodist Church, a post office named Chinaman's Flat, a reading room, and at least one private school. The urban settlement on the east side, which seems to have also been called Chinaman's Flat, spread along the main track from Maryborough to Dunolly via Cox Town, and was probably more commercial. In 1863, following more than a year of agitation and petitioning by the community, a government-regulated school named Chinaman's Flat opened in the western community, eventually in a solid-brick building on what is now Denyer's Road.

Establishment of Timor and Decline of Chinaman's Flat 
By 1857, the Maryborough & Dunolly Advertiser was predicting that Cox Town would eventually become a permanent creek-crossing settlement. By October 1861, the Tullaroop Road Board and the Bet Bet Road Board, whose shared boundary was the Bet Bet Creek, were in negotiations, encouraged by letters to the Maryborough and Dunolly Advertiser, to replace Cox Butcher's bridge with a more solid one with side rails. On 20 August 1866, a surveyed town north of what is now Bet Bet Creek Road, located in the civil Parish of Bet Bet and straddling the Bet Bet Creek itself (thus located in the successors to the road boards, the Shire of Tullaroop and the Shire of Bet Bet) was proclaimed, and named Timor.

Chinaman's Flat was initially the larger community, but as gold-winning became more complex and capital intensive, people moved to be closer to the huge mining operations exploiting the mainly north-trending leads nearer to and beyond Bet Bet Creek. Increased numbers of permanent buildings were constructed around the junction of Timor Road and Bet Bet Creek Road.  State School 1207 Timor, after five years in temporary premises in Chinaman's Flat/Bowenvale, was notified the land for its permanent (current) premises, in Timor, on Bet Bet Creek Road (the Chinaman's Flat border), was "temporarily reserved from sale, etc" from 15 April 1878. The current school building opened in 1880, and was later substantially extended in weatherboard.

In the areas closer to Maryborough, an increasing percentage of "reefers" in the remaining population were working the booming Leviathan mine and several smaller parallel gold reefs. The community and Chinaman's Flat School were renamed Leviathan Reef.  The school closed in 1902, with some pupils transferring to S.S.1207 Timor, and others to S.S.848 Alma The local names Chinaman's Flat and Central Chinamans faded with disuse, but the name of the main drainage course, Flat Creek, is still used.

Establishment of Bowenvale 
A "Bowen Park" in Timor was declared on 26 January 1874  probably after George Bowen, Governor of Victoria 1873–79. The first use of the name "Bowenvale," for sections of Chinaman's Flat seems to have been before November 1877. It was applied to the electoral division of the Electoral District of Maryborough and Talbot for that area. The Electoral Registrar was an Edward Beedon of Chinaman's Flat. Eventually the long main road and surrounding urban strip of Chinaman's Flat that abutted Timor at Bet Bet Creek Road, and had been populated and mined for decades, was surveyed, and on 11 January 1887 gazetted as an unnamed town. The documentation proclaiming its name as Bowenvale has not yet been found.

Late C19th Century and 20th Century 
Gradually the deep mines were overwhelmed by underground water, in spite of increasingly large pumping plants. The mines used long beam engine water pumps, with beams of up to 30 tons. Two of their massive stone fulcrums are still standing. With the loss of their elevated and surrounding superstructure, over the past century these have gradually been falsely re-imagined as "arches," "archways," and "pump house entrances," "boiler house entrances," or even "mine entrances."

Large scale mining ceased during World War I, though the extraction of gold from many heaps of mullock (waste material from the mines), using cyanide, lasted much longer. Much of the gravel from the leads and reefs was removed for construction.

Miners gradually moved away to other areas with ore or coal mining and onto other employment in New South Wales, particularly Broken Hill, or Western Australia, Queensland, New Zealand, or South Africa. Many moved to cities and the areas to the north of Victoria, particularly those settlements along the Maryborough to Mildura railway line, which had benefitted from the 1910 sale of Crown Land along its Murrayville-Pinnaroo branch. Many buildings were relocated by jinker to Maryborough or to developing farming areas, some over long distances.

In 1926, a memorial to the large number of local men who had volunteered to serve in World War I was erected in Bowenvale. Not long after, a new Catholic Church was erected diagonally opposite it in Timor. These addresses represented the naming split across the middle of the community.

A storm on New Year's Eve in 1960 severely damaged both the Community Hall and the Church of England Church in Bowenvale, which were then demolished. The community replaced the Hall but not the Church. The last hotel in the area, The Victoria in Bowenvale, closed in April 1961, and the last store, in Timor, closed in 1997. The Primary School, S.S.1207, had its weatherboard extension removed in 1937, but remains open.

Points of interest 
The landscape of Timor includes residential and agricultural buildings as well as evidence of the area's mining past, including depressions created by former mines as well as puddling machines, cellars and wells, substantial dams and drainage channels, eroded mullock heaps, and sports facilities. Two huge wet-mine beam-pump fulcrums, one granite and the other basalt, commonly referred to as "the arches," mark the sites of their former mines on either side of the Bet Bet Creek.

Located on the Timor-Bowenvale border is the 1926 Great War memorial, without names; a substantial 1880 school building which houses the small district primary school, Timor S.S.1207; a former late 1920s solid-brick Catholic church; a Bills horse trough; and the now-closed general store-post office, the oldest part being built in 1870-71. The 1960s-era Bowenvale Public Hall and the Fire Station are the most modern public buildings. Both the Hall and the School contain important Great War Honor Boards and the Fire Station houses the Bowenvale Fire Brigade, a single-tanker member of the Goldfields Group, District 2, North West Region of the Country Fire Authority.

The Timor-Bowenvale Cemetery was gazetted on 13 January 1868 and is kept in excellent condition. Unfortunately the records of burials before late 1889 were lost in a fire on the premises of the Registrar, Joseph DuBourg. The Cemetery Trustees in recent years have successfully rediscovered the identities of many early interments using death certificates and related records, but the exact locations of early burials without legible headstones have not been identified. The names and years of interment are displayed in a shelter at the Cemetery Entrance, and updated from time to time. Many burials and grave images are also at www.findagrave.com and www.billiongraves.com where additional, later information can often be found. The Cemetery Trust Secretary may be contacted by post at The Secretary, Timor-Bowenvale Cemetery, RMB 2129, Bowenvale 3465.

Notable people 

 Ted Horsington (1878–1947), N.S.W. politician
 Albert Lauder (1898–1971), Australian Rules footballer
 Jack Worrall (1861–1937), cricketer

Notes

References

External links 
 

Towns in Victoria (Australia)
Ghost towns in Victoria (Australia)